The Farris Center is a 6,000-seat multi-purpose arena in Conway, Arkansas. It was built in 1972.  It is home to the University of Central Arkansas Bears basketball program.

Renovations to the Farris Center in 2010 included new scoreboards and renovated court including logos.  New floor seating was added in 2012.

See also
 List of NCAA Division I basketball arenas

References

Indoor arenas in Arkansas
Sports venues in Arkansas
Central Arkansas Bears and Sugar Bears basketball
Buildings and structures in Conway, Arkansas